The Senegal has not an episcopal conference of their own, but Senegal is part of the episcopate of the Conference of Bishops of Senegal, Mauritania, Cape Verde, and Guinea Bissau (French: Conférence des Bishop's du Sénégal, de la Mauritanie, du Cap-Vert et de Guinée-Bissau).
It is a member of the Episcopal Conférence Régionale de l'Afrique de l'Ouest Francophone (CERAO) Symposium of Episcopal Conferences and of Africa and Madagascar (SECAM).

List of presidents of the Bishops' Conference:

1970-1987: Hyacinthe Thiandoum, archbishop of Dakar

1987-2005: Theodore-Adrien Sarr, Bishop of Kaolack and Archbishop of Dakar

Since 2005: Jean-Noël Diouf, Bishop of Tambacounda

References

External links
 http://www.gcatholic.org/dioceses/country/SN.htm
 http://www.catholic-hierarchy.org/country/sn.html 
 http://www.gcatholic.org/dioceses/country/MR.htm
 http://www.catholic-hierarchy.org/country/mr.html 
 http://www.gcatholic.org/dioceses/country/CV.htm
 http://www.catholic-hierarchy.org/country/cv.html 
 http://www.gcatholic.org/dioceses/country/GW.htm
 http://www.catholic-hierarchy.org/country/gw.html 

Senegal
Catholic Church in Senegal
Catholic Church in Mauritania
Catholic Church in Cape Verde
Catholic Church in Guinea-Bissau